Thomas Erlin Kaiser (16 February 1863 – 29 February 1940) was a Conservative member of the House of Commons of Canada. He was born in Edgely, York County, Canada West and became an author and physician.

Kaiser attended Weston High School then the University of Toronto where in 1890 he attained his Doctor of Medicine degree. He served on municipal boards in areas such as libraries, education, planning and water. In 1912, he became a member of the Ontario Board of Health. In 1916, Kaiser was made an honorary major of the Canadian Militia.

In 1907 and 1908, Kaiser was mayor of Oshawa. As an author, his books include Historic sketches of Oshawa (1921) and A history of the medical profession of the county of Ontario (1934).

He was first elected to Parliament at the Ontario riding in the 1925 general election then re-elected there in 1926. Kaiser was defeated by William Henry Moore of the Liberals in the 1930 election.

References

External links
 

1863 births
1940 deaths
20th-century Canadian historians
Canadian male non-fiction writers
Physicians from Ontario
Conservative Party of Canada (1867–1942) MPs
Mayors of Oshawa
Members of the House of Commons of Canada from Ontario
People from the Regional Municipality of York
University of Toronto alumni